Robert J. Corillion (26 January 1908 – 30 December 1997) was a French botanist.

References

1908 births
1997 deaths
20th-century French botanists
French phycologists